CHIR99021 is a chemical compound which acts as an inhibitor of the enzyme GSK-3. It has proved useful for applications in molecular biology involving the transformation of one cell type to another.

A mixture of CHIR99021 and valproic acid (FX-322) is claimed to increase the proliferation of inner ear stem cells, potentially allowing regrowth of the hair cells which are important for hearing, and are lost through chronic exposure to loud noises or as part of the aging process.

See also 
 SB-431542

References 

Kinase inhibitors
Aminopyrimidines
Imidazoles
Nitriles
Chloroarenes